Annabel Gault  (born 1952) is a British artist. Born in Midhurst, she studied at West Surrey College of Art and Royal Academy Schools. She works in a variety of mediums, often painting landscapes. Some of her artwork has been purchased by Hampshire County Council for display in their buildings.

Biography
Gault was born in Midhurst, West Sussex in 1952. Her father David Hamilton Gault and her mother Felicity Jane Gribble, had five children, of which Gault is the eldest. She studied at the West Surrey College of Art between 1973 and 1977 before training at the Royal Academy Schools until 1980.

In 1982, Gault married Johnathan Michael Franklin in London, however she retained her maiden name with respect to her artwork.

Artwork and exhibitions
Her first group exhibition was in 1979 and her first solo exhibition was in 1981 at the Oxford Gallery. Other group shows that Gault took part in included at the Thackeray Gallery in 1989 and at Pallant House in 1993 and, in 1994, at both the City Gallery in Leicester and the Redpath Gallery in Vancouver.

Gault's work is included in the UK Government Art Collection and in Hampshire County Council Contemporary Art Collection, including 10 landscape paintings of the area round Butser Hill, to be displayed within their offices. Gault has been called "a powerfully expressive landscape painter".

In 2012, she worked on large scale black and white drawings at the Tresco Botanical Gardens, Scilly Isles. Gault worked on these pieces in a variety of mediums, including charcoal, gouache, ink and wax resist.

Bibliography
 Annabel Gault: Recent Paintings (2010), introduction by Andrew Lambirth

References

External links
 

1952 births
Living people
21st-century British painters
21st-century British women artists
20th-century British painters
British landscape artists
People from Midhurst